The Secret of Selling the Negro is a 1954 film financed by Johnson Publishing Company, the publisher of Ebony magazine, to encourage advertisers to promote their products and services in the African-American media.

Summary 
The film showed African-American professionals, housewives and students as participants in the American consumer society, and it emphasized the economic power of this demographic community.

Production 
The film, which was shot in Kodachrome Color, featured appearances by Sinclair Weeks, Secretary of the U.S. Department of Commerce, and radio announcer Robert Trout. The film had its premiere in July 1954 at the Joseph Schlitz Brewing Company in Milwaukee, Wisconsin, and was shown on a non-theatrical basis.

References

External links 
Susan Merrill Squier, Communities of the Air: Radio Century, Radio Culture (Google Books).
The Secret of Selling the Negro on IMDb
The video on C-SPAN

1954 films
African-American films
Sponsored films
American independent films
Johnson Publishing Company
Documentary films about the media
1954 documentary films
1950s independent films
1950s American films